Story is a compilation album by Eric Clapton.

Track listing
 "Cocaine" - 3:35 (from Slowhand, 1977)
 "Lay Down Sally" - 3:50 (from Slowhand)
 "Wonderful Tonight" - 3:39 (from Slowhand)
 "Crossroads" (Live) - 4:12 (from Wheels of Fire, 1968)
 "After Midnight" - 3:08 (from Eric Clapton, 1970)
 "I Shot the Sheriff" - 4:22 (from 461 Ocean Boulevard, 1974)
 "Further Up the Road" (Live) - 7:31 (from Just One Night, 1980)
 "Rambling On My Mind" (Live) - 7:23 (from E. C. Was Here, 1975)
 "Layla" - 7:11 (from Layla and Other Assorted Love Songs, 1970)
 "Next Time You See Her" - 3:59 (from Slowhand, 1977)
 "Knockin' on Heaven's Door" - 4:21 (Non-album single, 1975)
 "Sunshine of Your Love" - 4:11 (from Disraeli Gears, 1967)
 "Tulsa Time" (Live) - 4:01 (from Just One Night)
 "Let It Grow" - 4:58 (from 461 Ocean Boulevard)
 "Steady Rollin' Man" - 3:12 (from 461 Ocean Boulevard)
 "Have You Ever Loved a Woman?" (Live) - 7:50 (from E. C. Was Here)

Chart performance

Weekly charts

Certifications

References

External links

Eric Clapton compilation albums
1991 compilation albums
Polydor Records compilation albums